Darmistus is a genus of broad-headed bugs in the family Alydidae. There are at least three described species in Darmistus.

Species
These three species belong to the genus Darmistus:
 Darmistus crassicornis Van Duzee, 1937
 Darmistus duncani Van Duzee, 1937
 Darmistus subvittatus Stål, 1859

References

Micrelytrinae